Qeqertarssdaq is an uninhabited island of Baffin Bay, Greenland. The island has an area of 265.3 km ² and a shoreline of 72 kilometres. The name Qeqertarssdaq means " the large island", which is ironic since it is Greenland's largest island.

References 

Uninhabited islands of Greenland